Jonathan J. Smith (January 13, 1844 – December 19, 1916) was an American businessman, newspaper editor, and politician.

Born in Harvard, McHenry County, Illinois, Smith served in the 65th Illinois Volunteer Infantry Regiment during the American Civil War. He then lived on a farm in Butler County, Iowa. In 1878, Smith moved to Barron, Wisconsin. He was one of the editors of the Barron Republican newspaper and owned a general store. He served as town treasurer, city treasurer, and mayor of Barron, Wisconsin. From 1895 to 1899, Smith served in the Wisconsin State Assembly and was a Republican. Smith died in Barron, Wisconsin.

Notes

External links

1844 births
1916 deaths
People from Harvard, Illinois
People from Barron, Wisconsin
People from Butler County, Iowa
People of Illinois in the American Civil War
Businesspeople from Wisconsin
Editors of Wisconsin newspapers
Mayors of places in Wisconsin
Republican Party members of the Wisconsin State Assembly
Journalists from Illinois
19th-century American businesspeople